Mu Chong (1904–1952), born Kim Mu-chong, was a Korean communist, independence activist, general and statesman of North Korea. He had been living in China for years when he joined the Chinese Communist Party fighting against the Japanese. After the liberation of Korea, he returned to North Korea and became a general in the Korean People's Army. He was an important member of the Yan'an faction, a group of pro-China communists in the North Korean government.

Biography
He was born in 1904 in Chongjin, North Hamgyeong Province as the son of Kim Ki-Jun.

Liberation of Korea and return
After the liberation of Korea on August 15, the Communist Korean Army came to North Korea separately while participating in the Civil War in China. When he returned to North Korea, Kim Il-sung was uncomfortable with his reputation and unwillingness to submit to him, and he was always anxious and vigilant and saw him as a strong static from the beginning. Mu Chong gave a look at the convenience of returning to North Korea from the members of the Korean People's Army Medical Corps and the Korean Independent Alliance. In October 1945, Mujung, who did not recognize both the CCP reconstruction and the Jangan sect in the Ministry of Economy and Trade, organized a separate committee to promote the reconstruction of the CCP in Pyongyang. In November 1945, he went directly to Pyongyang Station to support the settlement of North Korean soldiers who returned home. After that, he became the second secretary of the Workers' Party.

On October 21, 1945, the Soviet Union led military groups in North Korea to unify and organize the demonstrators. In the training of the cadres where the enemy guards were founded, and after taking off the shirt, Mu Chong took off the shirt and revolutionized. He complained about complaining about why only a person was propaganda without propaganda against me, and this was Kim Il-sung. He blew up alcohol, and when he was drunk, he gave up the name of Kim Il-sung and complained about it, making him dissatisfied. On December 17, the Communist Party of Korea became the first secretary of the Workers' Party.

From the end of December 1945, Kim Goo rebelled against the Moscow three-phase talks and pursued a strong opposition movement, becoming a member of the National General Mobilization Committee against Trusteeship and Reform formed on December 30. However, when the Workers' Party returned to Chantak, Mu Chong also turned to Chantak.

Participate in the creation of the People's Army
In 1946, he was selected as one of the Deputy Commanders of the Artillery Deputy Commander of the Security Officer Training Corps during his stay in Pyongyang in February of that year. While working in China, he was classified as a pro-Chinese, but he had trouble with China on the issue of Gando. He became the 2nd secretary of the Workers' Party of Korea, but in 1946 Kim Il-sung demoted him to the artillery commander of the security officer training battalion.

On May 10, 1947, in the presence of Choi Yong-geon and other People's Liberation Army officers, Kim Mu Chong insisted, “In return for fighting the blood of Korean soldiers in the Manchurian War, Joseon must obtain Jiandao”. Data published by the Unification Ministry of the Republic of Korea stated that since 1948, there has been a difference of opinion between North Korea and China due to the problem of taking over Baekdu Mountain.

After the founding of the People's Army in February 1948, he was appointed commander of the 2nd Command Center of the People's Army and became a national security officer after the establishment of the government of the Democratic People's Republic of Korea. [8] Participated in the 1st inter-Korean negotiations in April 1948, and the 2nd inter-Korean negotiations held in Haeju in August. On September 2, the first Supreme People's Assembly was elected.

Korean War
When the Korean War broke out on June 25, 1950, he participated in the Korean War as a national security guard, as a commander of the Artillery Commander of the KPA and as a commander of the Second Army of the KPA. During the Korean War, General Kim Kwang-hyop failed to defeat the Korean army properly, and after that, he became a resignation officer, and as a successor, he served as the 2nd Army Commander. However, he violated the order to defend Pyongyang, and immediately executed a retreat for the retreaters on the Nakdong River Front, deteriorating the atmosphere inside the army, being dismissed from the position, resigned from the military, and soon reinstated. At the end of the ceasefire, he was dismissed for responsibility for the defense of Pyongyang, and he became ill and was killed in October 1952.

Downfall
In November 1950, he was defeated by the U.S. Army and retreated from the Nakdong River. However, while patrolling Manpo in Jagang Province, he witnessed an injured warrior from Palo County who was close to Mu Chong. Immediately, Mu Chong immediately took a warrior from Palo County to the field hospital and asked for medical treatment from Li Chong-san, the Pyongbuk Provincial People's Committee's Sanitation Division. However, Li Chong-san was busy and refused, and Mu Chong was shot for threats, and Li Chong-san was killed on the spot. The accident in the Pyongbuk Field Military Hospital was a problem, and Mu Chong was immediately removed from office, and at the special meeting of the Central Committee of the Workers' Party held at Byeol-ri, Manpo-gun on December 4, 1950, before the 3rd power meeting was held. He was purged after being referred to the People's Army's military trial for charges of disobedience to orders, disloyalty of the fighting organization, and illegal murder in the retreat.

In 1951, the gastrointestinal disease, which he suffered from, worsened and he went to Beijing, China, with the help of Peng Dehuai, but was admitted to the People's Army Hospital of China. In October of that year, he died at the 39th Army Hospital, Chosun People's Army. The cause of death was gastrointestinal disease, and same are said to have been purged. The remains were buried in the patriotic tomb of Pyongyang.

Legacy
The death of Kim Moo-jung meant the fall of the coastal wave, which was one of the powers of North Korea. When Kim Moo-jung was killed in 1952, the coastal wave he led was destroyed by the August 1956 sectarian case and the 1958 Choi Chang-ik purge. Since then, Kim Il-sung's one-man dictatorship was established. However, Kim Il-sung highly praised the activity in the memoir "With the Century" by describing the fact that heartlessness played a large role in the independent movement in North Korea and the achievements of the Chinese Communist Party. According to this, Mu Chong was criticized after the Korean War and resigned from military service, but when he became ill, he was specially treated in China and had funeral services. [11] The commander of the People's Army of Korea, the National Guard, was awarded the first prize of the National Flag Medal. After the death of Yoon Gong-heum and the sectarian case in August, he was reinstated in 1994 and placed on the patriot tomb of Shinmi-ri, Pyongyang.

External links 
 무정… 비운의 혁명가:하(비록 조선민주주의인민공화국:14)
 [현대사 아리랑]백발백중 조선의용군 총사령 무정 (상) 경향신문

1904 births
1952 deaths
Korean communists
Korean independence activists
Korean generals
Members of the 1st Central Committee of the Workers' Party of North Korea
North Korean generals
North Korean military personnel of the Korean War
Deaths from digestive disease